An Jung-hyun (born 30 November 1983) is a South Korean former short track speed skater. He won a gold medal in 5000 m relay race at the 2002 World Championships.

He had also several successes at the World Cup. His first podium came during the 1998–99 World Cup when he won 3000 m race in Zoetermeer.

 1998/1999 ISU World Cup Zoetermeer 3000M 1
 2000/2001 ISU World Cup Trnava	3000m	1 	 
 2000/2001 ISU World Cup Nobeyama	5000m Relay	1 
 2000/2001 ISU World Cup Trnava	Overall	3

References
 Personal Bio

1983 births
Living people
South Korean male short track speed skaters
World Short Track Speed Skating Championships medalists
21st-century South Korean people